is a Japanese astronomer. He is a prolific discoverer of minor planets. Between 1987 and 2000, Ueda (in collaboration with Hiroshi Kaneda) discovered 705 asteroids.

He holds an MD and Ph.D. from Stanford University and is on the staff at the Graduate University for Advanced Study in Japan. The inner main-belt asteroid 4676 Uedaseiji, discovered in 1990, is named for him.

List of discovered minor planets

References 
 

1952 births
Living people
20th-century Japanese astronomers
Discoverers of asteroids
Stanford University alumni